Martin Telser (born 16 October 1978) is a former Liechtenstein football defender, who last played for FC Balzers in the 2. Liga Interregional.

International career
He made his international debut in friendly versus Germany in 1996 and went on to win 73 caps and score one goal for his country.

International goals

References

External links
Liechtenstein FA profile

1978 births
Living people
Liechtenstein international footballers
FC Vaduz players
Liechtenstein footballers
FC Balzers players
Association football defenders